Bozgabad (also Romanized as Bozgābād and Bezgābād) is a village in Garizat Rural District, Nir District, Taft County, Yazd Province, Iran. At the 2006 census, its population was 181, in 46 families.

References 

Populated places in Taft County